Jennifer King (born August 6, 1984) is an American football coach who is the assistant running backs coach for the Washington Commanders of the National Football League (NFL). King was the first black woman to become a full-time coach in the NFL following her promotion to assistant running backs coach for Washington in 2021. A former two-sport athlete at Guilford College, she has also coached women's college basketball.

Early life and college 
King was born August 6, 1984 in Eden, North Carolina and was raised in Reidsville, North Carolina. She attended Guilford College, where she played college basketball and softball, before graduating with a degree in sports management in 2006. Following graduation, she played in the Women's Football Alliance (WFA), where she was a quarterback and wide receiver for the Carolina Phoenix from 2006 to 2017, a defensive back and wide receiver for the New York Sharks in 2018, and safety for the D.C. Divas in 2019. She was a part of the Sharks team that won the 2018 WFA Division II Championship. She would later attend Liberty University in the mid-2010s and graduated with a Master of Science degree in sports management.

Coaching career

Basketball 

King was an assistant coach at Greensboro College from 2006 to 2016, where the program compiled a 182–63 record, 5 regular season championships, 2 conference tournament championships, and four NCAA tournament appearances. She was hired as the women's basketball head coach at Johnson & Wales University in North Carolina, where she turned around a program that had existed for only two years prior into a national champion within two seasons.

American football 

King was one of 40 women to attend the NFL's Women's Forum in 2018, where she met then-Carolina Panthers head coach Ron Rivera and expressed her interest in working with in the NFL. She was hired as an intern by the Panthers later that year, where she assisting in coaching their wide receivers. She got her first full-time coaching gig in 2018 as an assistant wide receivers and special teams coach for the Arizona Hotshots of the Alliance of American Football (AAF). After the AAF folded in 2019, King was once again brought on as an intern for the Panthers, this time working with the running backs.

King was also named an offensive assistant at Dartmouth for the 2019 season. While there, she was awarded one of the three inaugural grants of the Scott Pioli & Family Fund for Women Football Coaches & Scouts, given to female football coaches and scouts to provide financial assistance. She interned once more as a coach with the Washington Football Team in 2020, working once again under Rivera who joined Washington that season. She was promoted to assistant running backs coach the following year, making her the first black woman to become a full-time coach in NFL history. King served as the running backs coach for the West team in the 2022 East–West Shrine Bowl.

Personal life
In addition to her career in sports, King has also worked as a flight attendant for Delta Air Lines and as a police officer in High Point, North Carolina.

References

External links 
 
 Washington Commanders bio

1984 births
African-American basketball coaches
African-American basketball players
African-American coaches of American football
African-American players of American football
African-American police officers
American football defensive backs
American football quarterbacks
American football wide receivers
American women police officers
Arizona Hotshots coaches
Basketball coaches from North Carolina
Basketball players from North Carolina
Carolina Panthers coaches
Coaches of American football from North Carolina
College women's basketball coaches in the United States
Dartmouth Big Green football coaches
Female players of American football
Greensboro Pride
Guilford College alumni
Liberty University alumni
Living people
People from Eden, North Carolina
People from Reidsville, North Carolina
Players of American football from North Carolina
Softball players from North Carolina
Washington Commanders coaches
Washington Football Team coaches
Female coaches of American football